A total of 109 teams entered the 1982 FIFA World Cup qualification rounds, which began with the preliminary qualification draw on 14 October 1979 at Zürich, competing for a total of 24 spots in the final tournament, an increase from 16 in the previous World Cups. Spain, as the hosts, and Argentina, as the defending champions, qualified automatically, leaving 22 spots open for competition.

The 24 spots available in the 1982 World Cup would be distributed among the continental zones as follows:
 Europe (UEFA): 14 places, one to automatic qualifier Spain, while the other 13 places were contested by 33 teams (including Israel).
 South America (CONMEBOL): 4 places, one to automatic qualifier Argentina, while the other 3 places were contested by 9 teams.
 North, Central America and Caribbean (CONCACAF): 2 places, contested by 15 teams.
 Africa (CAF): 2 places, contested by 29 teams.
 Asia and Oceania (AFC and OFC): 2 places, contested by 21 teams.

A total of 103 teams played at least one qualifying match. A total of 306 qualifying matches were played, and 797 goals were scored (an average of 2.60 per match).

Qualified teams

The following 24 teams qualified for the 1982 FIFA World Cup:

Confederation qualification

AFC and OFC

Kuwait and New Zealand qualified.

CAF

Algeria and Cameroon qualified.

CONCACAF

Honduras and El Salvador qualified.

CONMEBOL

Group 1 - Brazil qualified.
Group 2 - Peru qualified.
Group 3 - Chile qualified.

UEFA

Group 1 - West Germany and Austria qualified.
Group 2 - Belgium and France qualified.
Group 3 - USSR and Czechoslovakia qualified.
Group 4 - Hungary and England qualified.
Group 5 - Yugoslavia and Italy qualified.
Group 6 - Scotland and Northern Ireland qualified.
Group 7 - Poland qualified.

Top goalscorers

9 goals
 Gary Cole
 Steve Sumner
 Brian Turner
 Karl-Heinz Rummenigge

8 goals
 Grant Turner
 Steve Wooddin

7 goals
 Hugo Sánchez
 Klaus Fischer
 Zlatko Vujović

6 goals
 Roger Milla
 Frank Arnesen

Notes

 The away goals rule was used for the first time as a tie-breaker for two-legged ties. Niger advanced twice due to this rule, eliminating Somalia and Togo.
 With the expansion of the final tournament, this marked the first time two teams from Africa and Asia qualified.
 New Zealand set numerous records on their first successful campaign. They played 15 qualifying matches and travelled 55,000 miles during qualification. Their 13–0 score against Fiji set a World Cup record as did Steve Sumner's six goals in that match. Also during qualifying goalkeeper Richard Wilson went a world cup record 921 minutes without conceding a goal.

External links
FIFA World Cup Official Site - 1982 World Cup Qualification 
RSSSF - 1982 World Cup Qualification

 
Qualification
FIFA World Cup qualification